Tea Cove was located northwest of Stephenville, Newfoundland and Labrador.

See also
List of communities in Newfoundland and Labrador

Populated coastal places in Canada
Populated places in Newfoundland and Labrador